The 2008 NatWest Pro40 was a league system 40 over competition. Sussex Sharks won Division One, while Essex Eagles finished top of Division Two, gaining promotion; Yorkshire Carnegie were also promoted, but Glamorgan Dragons lost their playoff match and remained in Division Two. Somerset Sabres' Marcus Trescothick was the leading run-scorer in the competition with 556 runs, while Jade Dernbach of Surrey Brown Caps claimed the most wickets, with 24.

Division One

Division two

References

NatWest Pro40
NatWest Group